Palakkad KSRTC bus terminal
Palakkad KSRTC bus terminal is a Kerala state-owned Kerala State Road Transport Corporation (KSRTC) bus station located in the center of the Palakkad city with Inter-State and Inter-City services.

Reconstruction
The terminal, constructed with 8.1 crores allocated by MLA Shafi Parambil from his asset development fund, is a three-Storey building featuring amenities including commercial space, space for parking interstate vehicles, street lights in the adjacent regions, drinking water for commuters, renovation of the workshop, renovation of workshop yard, restrooms and other amenities for drivers and conductors are also added to the new building. Renovated new bus terminal opened to the public on 10/11/2022.

See also
Palakkad
Stadium Bus Stand
Palakkad Junction railway station
Palakkad District

References

Buildings and structures in Palakkad district
Transport in Palakkad
Bus stations in Kerala